Dionne is a studio album by American singer Dionne Warwick. It was released by Warner Bros. Records in January 1972 in the United States. Her debut with the label following her departure from Scepter Records after the release of Very Dionne (1970), it features production by Burt Bacharach, Bob James, and Don Sebesky. Her lowest-charting album in years, it peaked at number 54 on the US Billboard 200, her highest peak during her stint with Warner Bros. Records.

Critical reception

AllMusic editor Tim Sendra found that "the record is only half good because half of the record is not arranged and produced by Bacharach. Instead, the chores are (mis)handled by Bob James and Don Sebesky, both of whom imitate the lush and sweeping sound of Bacharach but with none of his subtlety, wit or grace."

Track listing

Personnel and credits 
Credits adapted from the liner notes of Dionne.

Burt Bacharach – arrangements, conducting
Bob James – arrangements, conducting
Phil Ramone – recording engineer
Don Sebesky – arrangements, conducting
Ed Thrasher – art direction, photography
Dionne Warwick – vocals

Charts

References

Dionne Warwick albums
1972 albums
albums arranged by Burt Bacharach
albums arranged by Don Sebesky
albums produced by Burt Bacharach
albums produced by Bob James (musician)